James M. Oleske is an American pediatrician and HIV/AIDs researcher who is the emeritus François-Xavier Bagnoud (FXB) Professor of Pediatrics at Rutgers New Jersey Medical School in Newark, New Jersey. He is best known for his pioneering work in identifying HIV/AIDS as a pediatric disease, and treating and researching it beginning in the 1980s. He published one of the first articles identifying HIV/AIDS in children in JAMA in 1983 and was a co-author of one of the articles by Robert Gallo and others identifying the virus in Science in 1984.

Education 
Oleske earned a Bachelor of Science degree from the University of Detroit in 1967. He received his medical degree from New Jersey Medical School in 1971 at what was then the College of Medicine & Dentistry of New Jersey (CMDNJ), now known as Rutgers Biomedical and Health Sciences (RBHS), where he later did an internship and residency in the Department of Pediatrics. He received a master's degree in Public Health from Columbia University in 1974 and completed a fellowship in Pediatric Infectious Diseases & Immunology at Emory University Medical School in 1976.

Career 
Oleske was a pediatrician in Newark, New Jersey in the 1970s when little was known about how HIV/AIDS was transmitted. In the late 1970s, Oleske began noticing an unusual increase in the number of pediatric patients at his hospital with suppressed immune systems and life-threatening infections. In 1981, Oleske was asked to draw blood from an adult male patient at Saint Michael’s Medical Center who was a recovering IV drug user and who was suffering from what would later be known as AIDS. The patient immediately recognized Oleske and was surprised that the doctor did not know who he was. The patient told Oleske that he was the father of one of the doctor's pediatric patients. His young daughter had a severe immune disorder and died six months earlier from Pneumocystis carinii pneumonia (PCP). Oleske hadn't recognized the young girl’s father because he had looked robust and healthy only a few months ago and was now severely ill and underweight. This encounter made Oleske realize that the dying man, his daughter, and other immune deficient pediatric patients at the hospital were suffering from the same illness.

Doctors Oleske, Anthony Minnefor and Franklin Desposito were among the authors of an article about pediatric AIDS in the Journal of the American Medical Association (JAMA) in 1983. The article received criticism from the medical community because at the time the new immune deficiency was known to infect adults only through sexual contact, blood transfusion, and intravenous drug use. Because of the stigma surrounding AIDS, Oleske struggled to convince others that the disease could be transmitted to children and struggled to obtain funding to support pediatric AIDS research and treatment in Newark. Oleske often complained that most of the federal money went to prestigious institutions that didn't have any patients suffering from the disease.

The Littlest Victims, a docu-drama about Oleske and his work, was broadcast on national television in 1989. The program helped bring much needed awareness to the suffering of children in Newark, and unexpected funding and support. After seeing the television program, Albina du Boisrouvray, a French Countess, contacted Oleske and offered him a $1.25 million donation.  Throughout the years, she continued supporting AIDS research in Newark by endowing a professorship at the University of Medicine and Dentistry of New Jersey (UMDNJ) and providing funding to support UMDNJ’s clinical pediatric AIDS program at the United Hospitals Medical Center of Newark. Funding from Du Boisrouvrary helped establish the Francois-Xavier Bagnoud (FXB) Clinical Care Center, named in honor of her deceased son, at the UMDNJ campus. FXB pioneered perinatal and pediatric AIDS care and clinical research and established the first international training program for medical professionals who treat HIV-infected pregnant women.

Oleske is a co-founder of Circle of Life Children's Center, a palliative care program for children with serious terminal diseases. Circle of Life was formed in 2002, with Lynn Czarniecki. Oleske served as Director of the Center.

Dr. Oleske is known for always carrying a stuffed rabbit in the pocket of his lab coat. He has given thousands of stuffed rabbits to his pediatric patients to help comfort them during their medical procedures and hospital stays. He began this practice to honor the memory of a young HIV patient who gifted Oleske with a beloved purple rabbit named Fred he carried to comfort him through medical tests and procedures. The young boy passed away on the same day he gave the doctor his rabbit.

A documentary entitled Don Quixote in Newark about Oleske and his struggle to identify and treat pediatric AIDS was broadcast on PBS in 2022.

Awards 
 Lifetime Achievement Award, American Academy of Pediatrics for “contributions in advancing the prevention, diagnoses and treatment of Pediatric HIV/AIDS.”

References

External links 

 Rutgers Biomedical Health Sciences, UMDNJ Legacy Dr. James Oleske September 25, 2013.
 James Oleske, C-SPAN Video Library
 James M. Oleske Oral History, OH001. RBHS Special Collections in the History of Medicine, Rutgers University Libraries.
 Chernesky, Jason M., “the Littlest Victims”: Pediatric Aids And The Urban Ecology Of Health In The Late-Twentieth-Century United States (2020). Publicly Accessible Penn Dissertations. 3878.
 "Don Quixote in Newark" (2022). Official website.

Living people
HIV/AIDS researchers
Rutgers University faculty
Columbia University Mailman School of Public Health alumni
University of Detroit Mercy alumni
Pediatricians
Year of birth missing (living people)